This is a list of schools in Liverpool in the English county of Merseyside.

State-funded schools

Primary schools

All Saints' RC Primary School
Anfield Road Primary School
Arnot St Mary CE Primary School
Banks Road Primary School
Barlows Primary School
The Beacon CE Primary School
Belle Vale Community Primary School
Bishop Martin CE Primary School
Blackmoor Park Infants' School
Blackmoor Park Junior School
Blessed Sacrament RC Primary School
Blueberry Park
Booker Avenue Infant School
Booker Avenue Junior School
Broad Square Community Primary School
Broadgreen Primary School
Childwall CE Primary School
Childwall Valley Primary School
Christ the King RC Primary School
Corinthian Community Primary School
Croxteth Community Primary School
Dovecot Primary School
Dovedale Primary School
Emmaus CE/RC Primary School
Faith Primary Academy
Fazakerley Primary School
Florence Melly Community Primary School
Four Oaks Primary School
Garston CE Primary School
Gilmour Infant School
Gilmour Junior School
Greenbank Primary School
Gwladys Street Primary and Nursery School
Heygreen Primary School
Holy Cross RC Primary School
Holy Family RC Primary School
Holy Name RC Primary School
Holy Trinity RC Primary School
Hope Valley Community Primary School
Hunts Cross Primary School
Kensington Primary School
King David Primary School
Kingsley Community School
Kirkdale St Lawrence CE Primary School
Knotty Ash Primary School
Lawrence Community Primary School
Leamington Community Primary School
LIPA Primary School
Lister Infant and Nursery School
Lister Junior School
Liverpool College
Longmoor Community Primary School
Mab Lane Junior Mixed and Infant School
Matthew Arnold Primary School
Middlefield Community Primary School
Monksdown Primary School
Mosspits Lane Primary School
Much Woolton RC Primary School
New Park Primary School
Norman Pannell Primary School
Northcote Primary School
Northway Primary and Nursery School
Our Lady and St Philomena's RC Primary School
Our Lady and St Swithin's RC Primary School
Our Lady Immaculate RC Primary School
Our Lady of Good Help RC Primary School
Our Lady of the Assumption RC Primary School
Our Lady's Bishop Eton RC Primary School
Phoenix Primary School
Pinehurst Primary School
Pleasant Street Primary School
Ranworth Square Primary School
Rice Lane Primary School
Roscoe Primary School
Rudston Primary School
Runnymede St Edward's RC Primary School
Sacred Heart RC Primary School
St Ambrose RC Academy
St Anne's Junior Mixed and Infant School
St Anne's RC Primary School
St Anthony of Padua RC Primary School
St Austin's RC Primary School
St Cecilia's RC Infant School
St Cecilia's RC Junior School
St Charles' RC Primary School
St Christopher's RC Primary School
St Clare's RC Primary School
St Cleopas' CE Junior Mixed and Infant School
St Cuthbert's RC Primary and Nursery School
St Finbar's RC Primary School
St Francis de Sales RC Infant and Nursery School
St Francis de Sales RC Junior School
St Gregory's RC Primary School
St Hugh's RC Primary School
St John's RC Primary School
St Margaret's Anfield CE Primary School
St Mary's CE Primary School
St Matthew's RC Primary School
St Michael-in-the-Hamlet Community Primary School
St Michael's RC Primary School
St Nicholas RC Academy
St Oswald's RC Primary School
St Paschal Baylon's RC Primary School
St Patrick's RC Primary School
St Paul's and St Timothy's RC Infant School
St Paul's RC Junior School
St Sebastian's RC Primary School and Nursery
St Silas CE Primary School
St Teresa of Lisieux RC Primary School
St Vincent de Paul RC Primary School
Smithdown Primary School
Springwood Heath Primary School
Stockton Wood Community Primary School
Sudley Infant School
Sudley Junior School
The Trinity RC Academy
Wavertree CE School
Wellesbourne Community Primary School
Whitefield Primary School
Windsor Community Primary School
Woolton Primary School

Secondary schools

The Academy of St Francis of Assisi
The Academy of St Nicholas
Alsop High School
Archbishop Beck Catholic College
Archbishop Blanch School
Bellerive FCJ Catholic College
The Belvedere Academy
Broughton Hall High School
Calderstones School
Cardinal Heenan Catholic High School
Childwall Sports and Science Academy
Dixons Broadgreen Academy
Dixons Croxteth Academy
Dixons Fazakerley Academy
Gateacre School
Holly Lodge Girls' College
King David High School
King's Leadership Academy Liverpool
Liverpool Blue Coat School
Liverpool College
Liverpool Life Sciences UTC
North Liverpool Academy
Notre Dame Catholic College
St Edward's College
St Francis Xavier's College
St Hilda's Church of England High School
St John Bosco Arts College
St Julie's Catholic High School
St Margaret's Church of England Academy
The Studio School Liverpool
West Derby School

Special and alternative schools

Abbots Lea School
ASPIRE Centre, Kings Leadership Academy
Bank View High School
Childwall Abbey School
Clifford Holroyde Specialist SEN College
Ernest Cookson School
Everton Free School
Harmonize Academy AP Free School
Hope School
Millstead School
New Heights High School
Palmerston School
Princes School
Redbridge High School
Sandfield Park School
Woolton High School

Further education
City of Liverpool College

Independent schools

Primary and preparatory schools
The Belvedere Preparatory School
Carleton House Preparatory School

Senior and all-through schools
Auckland College
Christian Fellowship School
Nazene Danielle School of Performing Arts

Special and alternative schools

Assess Education
Birtenshaw School Merseyside
Cavendish View School
Employability Solutions Independent School
Lakeside School
Liverpool Progressive School
NexGen Academy
Progress Schools
Prudentia Education
Royal School for the Blind
St Vincent's School
SENDSCOPE

Further education
Liverpool Theatre School

Liverpool
Schools
Schools in Liverpool